The Vancouver Police Department (VPD) is the police force for the City of Vancouver in British Columbia, Canada. It is one of several police departments within the Metro Vancouver Area and is the second largest police force in the province after RCMP "E" Division.

VPD was the first Canadian municipal police force to hire a female officer and the first to start a marine squad.

VPD, along with eleven other BC municipal police forces, seconds officers to the Combined Forces Special Enforcement Unit – British Columbia.

VPD now occupies the former Vancouver Organizing Committee for the 2010 Olympic and Paralympic Winter Games (VANOC) building at 3585 Graveley Street, which houses administrative and specialized investigation units.

History
At the first meeting of Vancouver City Council, Vancouver's first police officer, Chief Constable John Stewart, was appointed on May 10, 1886.

On June 14, 1886, the morning after the Great Fire of 1886, Mayor McLean appointed Jackson Abray, V.W. Haywood, and John McLaren as special constables.  With uniforms from Seattle and badges fashioned from American coins, this four man team became Vancouver's first police department based out of the City Hall tent at the foot of Carrall Street. These four were replaced in 1887 by special constables sent by the provincial government in Victoria for not keeping the peace during the anti-Asian unrest of that year. The strength of the force increased from four to fourteen as a result.

By 1904, the department had grown to 31 members and occupied a new police building at 200 Cordova Street. In 1912, Vancouver's first two women were taken on the force as matrons. With the amalgamation of Point Grey and South Vancouver with Vancouver in 1929, the department absorbed the two smaller police forces under the direction of Chief Constable W.J. Bingham, a former district supervisor with the Metropolitan Police in London. By the 1940s the department had grown to 570 members.

In 1912, L.D. Harris and Minnie Miller were hired as the first two policewomen in Canada.

In 1917, Chief Constable McLennan was killed in the line of duty in a shoot-out in Vancouver's East End. Responding to a call by a landlord attempting to evict a tenant, the police were met by gunfire. Along with McLennan, the shooter was killed in the battle, as was a nine-year-old boy in the vicinity at Georgia and Jackson streets, which is now marked by a mosaic memorial. A detective who lost an eye in the shootout, John Cameron, later became the chief constable of the New Westminster Police Department before taking the top job of the Vancouver force, which he occupied from 1933 to the end of 1934.

Another member of the force was killed in the line of duty in 1922. Twenty-three-year-old constable, Robert McBeath, was shot by a man stopped for impaired driving. McBeath had received the Victoria Cross for "most conspicuous bravery" at the Battle of Cambrai in France in the First World War. McBeath's killer, Fred Deal, was initially sentenced to death, but won an appeal reducing it to life in prison because he had been beaten while in custody. The marine squad's boat, the R.G. McBeath VC, was commissioned in 1995 and named in honour of McBeath.

Plans for a new police building at 312 Main Street began in 1953. The Oakridge police station opened in 1961.

A police memorial at 325 Main St. is dedicated to the Vancouver Police Department members who died in the First and Second world wars and lists the Vancouver Police Department members killed in the line of duty in Vancouver.

In 1935, under Chief Constable W. W. Foster, the Vancouver Police Department was complemented with hundreds of special constables because of a waterfront strike led by communists, which culminated in the Battle of Ballantyne Pier, a riot that broke out when demonstrators attempted to march to the docks to confront strikebreakers. Also that year, nearly 2,000 unemployed men from the federal relief camps scattered throughout the province flocked to Vancouver to protest camp conditions. After two months of incessant demonstrations, the camp strikers left Vancouver and began the On-to-Ottawa Trek.

The Vancouver Police were at the centre of one of the biggest scandals in the city's history in 1955. Feeling frustrated that blatant police corruption was being ignored by the local media, a reporter for the Vancouver Daily Province switched to a Toronto-based tabloid, Flash. He wrote a sensational article alleging corruption at the highest levels of the police department in Vancouver, specifically, that a pay-off system had been implemented whereby gambling operations that paid the police were left alone and those that did not were harassed. After the Flash article appeared in Vancouver, the allegations could no longer be ignored, and a Royal Commission, the Tupper Commission, was struck to hold a public inquiry. Chief Constable Walter Mulligan fled to the United States, another officer from the upper ranks committed suicide, and still another attempted suicide rather than face the inquiry. Other scandals and public inquiries plagued the force before and since this one, dubbed the "Mulligan Affair", but none were so dramatic. An earlier inquiry into corruption in 1928 was ambiguous in its conclusions as to the extent of the problem. The last major inquiry into policing in Vancouver focused largely on police accountability. Judge Wally Oppal (later provincial attorney general), submitted the results of his report in 1994 in a four volume package entitled Closing the Gap: Policing and the Community.

Leonard Hogue, a constable in the police department was the perpetrator in the 1965 Coquitlam Massacre.

In 2009, the RCMP "E" Division joined forces with VPD to operate the Integrated National Security Enforcement Team (INSET)—Vancouver, operating out of VPD facilities instead of the INSET-BC Surrey operation base.

Organization

The 1,716 employees of the VPD  have been headed by Chief Constable Adam Palmer since May 6, 2015, following the retirement of Jim Chu. Three sections or units are assigned to the office of the chief constable:

 Chief's executive officer: Inspector Ruben Sorge
 Planning, research and audit section:  Drazen Manojlovic
 Community and public affairs section: Director Simi Heer
 Block watch
 Community policing centres
 Diversity and Aboriginal policing section
 Victim services unit

The Vancouver Police Union is a trade union that represents 1,450 front-line police officers, jail guards and special constables of the Vancouver Police Department.

Community policing centres

Organization
Community policing centres (CPCs), except the Granville Downtown and Kitsilano Fairview CPCs, are run by registered societies. The Granville Downtown CPC is under the direct control of the District 1 commander whereas Kitsilano Fairview is under the District 4 commander.

Budget
Each CPC receives $108,200 annually from the VPD, with the exception of two non-society based CPCs which have a combined budget of $140,000. The budget is delivered in four quarterly payments and they can be used towards staff salaries, CPC programs, costs from electricity, renting office space, etc.

Operation
CPCs are run by volunteers on a day-to-day basis with the supervision from paid staffs. Each year, the VPD audits all the CPCs and then reports to the city council on budgeting.

Each CPC is assigned a neighbourhood police officer (NPO) who provides resources and guidance for the operation of the CPC.

Programs
Each CPC offers different programs based on budget and neighbourhood needs. For example:

 Taking non-emergency/lost and found property reports
 Project Griffin
 Working in conjunction with the Insurance Corporation of British Columbia for the Speed Watch Program
 Working in conjunction with the Insurance Corporation of British Columbia for the Stolen Auto Recovery Program
 Working in conjunction with the VPD for the Block Watch Program
 Community patrol (foot and bike)
 Bike Roadeo, program for young children in bike safety 
 Outreach and education programs
 Engraving
 Community cleanup
 Child Find
 Citizen's Crime Watch

However, CPCs do not offer any of the following services:

 Taking emergency report
 Criminal record checks
 Law/bylaw enforcement
 Legal/policing advice
 Victim services
 Situations that requires police attendance/assistance

Divisions
The force has three operating divisions:

Operations

Led by Deputy Chief Constable Howard Chow

 All patrols
 Mounted squad
 Marine squad
 Traffic section
 Emergency and operations planning section
 Emergency planning unit
 Operational planning unit
 Vancouver Traffic Authority (special municipal constable with restricted peace officer status)
 Emergency response section
 Emergency response team
 Dog squad

Investigation

Led by Deputy Chief Constable Laurence Rankin since 2016. As an Inspector, Laurence Rankin led the Integrated Riot Investigation Team. This is a team of investigators and support personnel who investigated the 2011 Vancouver Stanley Cup riot. Deputy Chief Rankin is a provincially accredited Team Commander for major investigations. In 2014, he completed a Master of Arts (M.A.) degree in criminal justice at the University of the Fraser Valley. In 2015, he completed the Canadian Association of Chiefs of Police (CACP) Executive Global Studies Program, during which he studied international approaches to cybercrime. In 2019, Deputy Chief Rankin completed the Leadership in Counter Terrorism Program, a joint senior executive leadership program that exposes participants to case studies, literature and discussions on terrorism from international experts, academics, and practitioners. In 2018, Deputy Chief Rankin was invested into the Order of Merit of the Police Forces by the Governor General of Canada.

Investigative Services

Major Crime Section

Organized Crime Section

Special Investigation Section

Investigative Support Services 

Forensic Services Section

General Investigation Section

Tactical Support Section

Youth Services Section

Support services

Led by Deputy Chief Constable Steve Rai

 Communications section
 Court and detention services section
 Vancouver Jail guard (special municipal constable with peace officer status)
 Human resources section
 Facilities section
 Financial services section
 Information management section
 Information technology section
 Professional standards section
 Recruiting and training section

Rank structure

 Special municipal constable (traffic authority/jail guard/community safety personnel)

List of chief constables

 Adam Palmer 2015–present
 Jim Chu 2007–2015
 Jamie Graham 2002–2007
 Terry Blythe 1999–2002
 Bruce Chambers 1997–1999
 Raymond J. Canuel 1994–1997
 Bob Stewart 1981–1991
 Don Winterton 1974–1981
 John Fisk 1968–1974
 Ralph Booth 1962–1968
 George Archer 1956–1962
 Alexander G. McNeill 1945 - 1947
 Walter Mulligan 1947–1955 – charged with corruption and fled to Los Angeles, returned to Canada in 1963 and died in 1987
 John McLaren 1890–?
 John Stewart 1886–1890

Controversies

Battle of Ballantyne Pier 
On 18 June 1935, roughly 1,000 longshoremen and their supporters marched towards the Heatley Street entrance to Ballantyne Pier as a demonstration for more livable wages. They were led by Victoria Cross recipient Mickey O'Rourke and a contingent of World War I veterans and marched behind a Union Jack flag, to great symbolic effect. They soon encountered the Vancouver police, who partook in mass brutality. Many, including bystanders, were injured. In light of the injuries, the Ukrainian Community Centre was used as a makeshift hospital. Members of the women's auxiliary operated the centre, before the Vancouver police threw tear gas into the first-aid centre. The strike, in congruence with other, similar West Coast strikes, led to the right to collective bargaining and the creation of International Longshore and Warehouse Union.

Bloody Sunday 
Bloody Sunday was a 1938 confrontation between peaceful sit-in strikers and the Vancouver police, along with other forces. After mass unemployment across Canada, many people migrated to Vancouver for job opportunities. When unemployment persisted and workers felt no financial relief, they organized a massive peaceful demonstration, occurring in multiple locations for an entire month. Protesters occupied Hotel Georgia, the Vancouver Art Gallery (then located at 1145 West Georgia Street), and the main post office (now the Sinclair Centre). Later that day, 10,000 supporters went to Oppenheimer Park in condemnation of excessive police force of the Vancouver Police Department.

Gastown riots 
Also known as "The Battle of Maple Tree Square", Vancouver Police attacked a peaceful protest in the Gastown neighbourhood on August 7, 1971. The protestors opposed the use of coercive undercover police tactics. The Vancouver Police were accused of heavy-handed tactics such as indiscriminate beatings with their batons and charging on horseback at crowds of onlookers and tourists.

Geography
The VPD is divided into four geographic districts:

 District 1: Downtown, Granville, West End and Coal Harbour
 District 2: Grandview-Woodland and Hastings-Sunrise
 Beat Enforcement Team: Downtown Eastside, Chinatown and Gastown
 District 3: Collingwood and South Vancouver
 District 4: Kerrisdale, Oakridge, Dunbar, West Point Grey, Kitsilano, Arbutus, Shaughnessy, Fairview, Musqueam and Marpole

Fleet
 Eurocopter EC120 Colibri: air patrol operations shared with RCMP "E" Division
 Ford Crown Victoria interceptors (being phased out)
 Lenco BearCat APC: purchase approved
 Cambli International Thunder 1 ARV—delivered 2010 for ERT use
 Ford Taurus two unmarked black Ford interceptor sedans (the demonstrators that were kept)
 Dodge Charger police pursuit (replacement for Ford Crown Victoria)
 Ford police interceptor utility unmarked and marked supervisor vehicles
 Chevrolet Tahoe unmarked SUVs
 Ford Fusion CSP/special investigations
 Ford F-150 traffic authority
 Ford F-350 ERT
 Ford Expedition ERT
 Mobile Command Centre Mobile Command Centre for Communications and transportation of command members.

See also
 Combined Forces Special Enforcement Unit – British Columbia
 E-Comm, 9-1-1 call and dispatch centre for Southwestern BC
 Project Griffin, crime prevention/reduction program launched in 2009
 RCMP "E" Division—British Columbia's contract policing for surrounding areas (UBC, Burnaby, Surrey, etc.)
 Metro Vancouver Transit Police
 Vancouver Police Pipe Band
Bloody Sunday (1938)
Internment of Japanese Canadians
Gastown riots
Missing and murdered Indigenous women

References

 "Vancouver Police Department – History"
 Joe Swan, A Century of Service: The Vancouver Police 1886–1986. Vancouver: Vancouver Police Historical Society and Centennial Museum, 1986.

External links
 
 Vancouver Police Museum
 Vancouver Police Foundation

Law enforcement agencies of British Columbia
Police Department
Government agencies established in 1886
1886 establishments in British Columbia